José Eduardo Jara González (born October 19, 1984), known as José Jara, is a Paraguayan footballer who currently plays as a striker and midfielder for Persepam Madura Utama in Indonesia Super League.

References

External links
 
 
 Profile at liga-indonesia.co.id 

1984 births
Living people
Paraguayan footballers
Paraguayan expatriate footballers
Association football forwards
Paraguayan expatriate sportspeople in Indonesia
Expatriate footballers in Indonesia
Liga 1 (Indonesia) players
Persepam Madura Utama players